World Inequality Database (WID), previously The World Wealth and Income Database, also known as WID.world, is an extensive, open and accessible database "on the historical evolution of the world distribution of income and wealth, both within countries and between countries".

World Inequality Report
WID findings are used by the World Inequality Lab at the Paris School of Economics to compile the World Inequality Report. The first report was released December 14, 2017 during the first WID.world Conference. Authors who compiled the report included Facundo Alvaredo, Lucas Chancel, Thomas Piketty,  Emmanuel Saez, and Gabriel Zucman. WID is part of an international collaborative effort of over a hundred researchers in five continents.

The 2022 World Inequality Report was published on Dec. 7th 2021.

History

Pioneers of income inequality studies include Simon Kuznets' 1953 study, and A. B. Atkinson and Alan Harrison's 1978 study. In 1953 Kuznet co-edited Shares of Upper Income Groups in Savings. Kuznet, an American economist, statistician, demographer, economic historian, and winner of the 1971 Nobel Memorial Prize in Economic Sciences, identified the historical series of economic movements such as "Kuznets swing", in the economy cycles.

Thomas Piketty
In Capital is Back, University of California at Berkeley's French economist Gabriel Zucman and Thomas Piketty investigate the evolution of aggregate wealth-to-income ratios in the top eight developed economies, reaching back as far as 1700 in the case of the U.S., U.K., Germany, and France, and find that wealth-income ratios have risen from about "200-300% in 1970 to 400-600% in 2010", levels unknown since the 18th and 19th centuries. Most of the change can be explained by the long-run recovery of asset prices, the slowdown of productivity, and population growth. According to The New York Times Book Review, Zucman is mostly known for his research on tax havens, popularized in his book The Hidden Wealth of Nations.

References

External links
 The World Wealth and Income Database

Income distribution
Taxation and redistribution
Economics research
Economic research institutes
Research on poverty
Public economics
Books about economic inequality
Economic globalization
Social inequality
Taxation in the United States
Economic inequality in the United States